The 2004 season was the 13th full year of competitive football in the Baltic country as an independent nation. The Estonia national football team played sixteen international matches in 2004.

Results

Estonia vs Belarus U-21

Malta vs Estonia

Moldova vs Estonia

Estonia vs Northern Ireland

Estonia vs Albania

Estonia vs Scotland

Estonia vs Denmark

Czech Republic vs Estonia

Estonia vs FYR Macedonia

Liechtenstein vs Estonia

Estonia vs Luxembourg

Portugal vs Estonia

Latvia vs Estonia

Russia vs Estonia

Thailand vs Estonia

Hungary vs Estonia

Notes

References
 RSSSF detailed results
 RSSSF detailed results

2004
2004 national football team results
National